Numenes siletti is a moth of the family Erebidae first described by Francis Walker in 1855. It is found in north-eastern India and Peninsular Malaysia.

References

Moths described in 1855
Lymantriinae